German submarine U-56 was a Type IIC U-boat of Nazi Germany's Kriegsmarine that served in the Second World War. She was built by Deutsche Werke, Kiel as yard number 255. Ordered on 17 June 1937, she was laid down on 21 September, launched on 3 September 1938 and commissioned on 26 November under the command of Kapitänleutnant Wilhelm Zahn.

U-56 was initially assigned to the 5th U-boat Flotilla during her training period, until 31 December 1939, when she was reassigned to the 1st U-boat Flotilla for operations.

Design
German Type IIC submarines were enlarged versions of the original Type IIs. U-56 had a displacement of  when at the surface and  while submerged. She had two shafts and two  propellers.

U-56 was fitted with three  torpedo tubes at the bow, five torpedoes or up to twelve Type A torpedo mines, and a  anti-aircraft gun. The boat had a complement of 25.

Service history

First and second patrols
U-56s first two patrols, completed during her workup and training period, were relatively uneventful cruises in the North Sea. No ships were attacked during this period.

Third patrol
U-56 started her third patrol on 23 October 1939.

At 10 a.m. on 30 October 1939, U-56 avoids detection by ten British destroyers  and battle cruiser Hood, protecting the Home Fleet west of the Orkney Islands and came within striking distance of HMS Nelson and Rodney.

In U-56 Captain Zahn's own account of the events, three cruisers were heading straight toward his U-boat's position, making any attack by him almost impossible, when suddenly they veered by twenty to thirty degrees from their previous course opening the field of attack and bringing him into a direct line of fire with HMS Nelson and HMS Rodney. Rodney was the lead ship of the convoy and Zahn decided to wait until it passed and concentrated his sights on Nelson. The U-boat came within the point-blank range of 800 metres of the ship and Zahn's chances of striking and sinking it were high.

He fired three G7e(TII) torpedoes from U-56's three torpedo tubes toward the flagship. No detonations occurred but two torpedoes allegedly struck the hull of the Nelson: one of the sonar operators of U-56 claimed to have heard sound of impact with Nelson's hull. The third torpedo subsequently exploded at sea without causing damage.

The incident has been described as the "most important non-sinking" of the conflict. After the attack Zahn became widely known as the "Man who almost killed Churchill" amongst the U-boat submariner corps. It is often claimed that First Lord of the Admiralty Winston Churchill, Admiral of the Fleet Sir Charles Forbes, and admiral Sir Dudley Pound who was the First Sea Lord at the time were on board HMS Nelson. However, Nelson's ship log point to them visiting HMS Nelson on Greenock on 31 October 1939. Still, some Internet sources claim Churchill was on board HMS Nelson.

After the attack Zahn ordered the U-boat to descend to a deeper level to avoid depth charges, since the destroyers had by now detected its presence. In the evening Zahn ordered U-56 to surface and subsequently sent a radio report to Berlin listing the targets in the group including HMS Rodney. The delay in the transmission of the information was caused by Zahn's depression caused by missing his target. Had this delay in Zahn's report not happened, the German command could have sent U-58, which was in the area at the time, to renew the attack on the British targets.

Because of his failure to destroy the Nelson, Zahn became depressed and Karl Dönitz felt obliged to relieve him of his U-56 command and sent him back to Germany to become an instructor. Later, in his memoirs, Dönitz called the failed attack by U-56 "an exceptionally serious failure" but did not blame Zahn whose daring, in the presence of the destroyers, he praised, saying "The commander who had delivered the attack with great daring when surrounded by twelve escorting destroyers, was so depressed by this failure, in which he was in no way to blame, that I felt compelled to withdraw him for the time being from active operations and employ him as an instructor at home". In addition Dönitz had received reports from his men concerning problems with the defective G7e torpedoes that they were using and knew that the failures were caused by the faulty torpedoes. Zahn eventually recovered and later that year was given command of U-69.

U-56 ended her third patrol arriving at Kiel, on 13 November 1939.

Fourth patrol
The submarine's luck changed for the better on her fourth foray.

Fifth, sixth, seventh, eighth and ninth patrols
The fifth patrol was also uneventful and took the boat into the southern North Sea.

Patrol numbers six and seven were both more of the same.

The boat's eighth sortie ranged far and wide; across the North Sea to the Scottish west coast, north of Shetland, then the other side of the North Sea to the coast of Norway, but further success continued to elude her.

Her ninth effort was to the north of the Hebrides and again round the Shetland Islands.

Tenth patrol
U-56s tenth patrol took her to the newly captured port of Lorient on the French Atlantic coast. She departed Wilhelmshaven on 29 June 1940; her route was to the west of Ireland, culminating in her arrival on 21 July.

11th patrol
She was near Ireland once more when she sank the Boma on 5 August 1940 northwest of Malin Head.

12th patrol
All the torpedoes missed; the Germans were unaware of the situation. The boat was on her way, via the gap between the Faroe and Shetland Islands, back to Germany. She arrived in Kiel on 15 September.

Fate
Whilst in Kiel on 3 April 1945, U-56 was badly damaged in a US air raid and subsequently decommissioned. She was then scuttled by her crew on 3 May 1945 in position . Soon after the war ended the wreck was raised and broken up.

Summary of raiding history

References

Notes

Citations

Bibliography

External links

 

1938 ships
German Type II submarines
U-boats commissioned in 1938
World War II submarines of Germany
Ships built in Kiel
Maritime incidents in April 1945
Operation Regenbogen (U-boat)